Nalanda Educational Institutions (NEI) is an educational society based in Vijayawada. It caters to students from pre-school to post-graduation. It was founded by four teachers in 1988, all well-known in their respective subjects. Nalanda became an education group in Andhra Pradesh, Telangana and Karnataka. It is often mistaken with Nalanda University in Bihar but there is no affiliation between these institutions.

Mission
To inspire every individual's academic, emotional, societal, physical, creative and spiritual potentials to help them achieve highest aspirations of the human spirit.

Campuses 
CA Academy
 Nalanda CA Academy Vijayawada: Benz Circle
 Nalanda CA Academy Vijayawada: Gardens
 Nalanda CA Academy Bellary: Vijayanagar Colony
 Nalanda CA Academy Ananthapur, beside railway station
 Nalanda CA Academy Hubli, SP Road

Degree Colleges
 Nalanda Degree & PG College Vijayawada : M.G.Road, Labbipet
 Nalanda Degree College Vijayawada : Bhavanipuram
 Nalanda Degree College Machilipatnam : Pavitra College premises, Ramanaidupeta
 Nalanda Degree College Hubli: Akshya Colony

Playschools
 Nalanda Toddlers Vijayawada: Benz Circle
 Nalanda Toddlers Vijayawada: Satyanarayana Puram
 Nalanda Toddlers Vijayawada: Edupugallu
 Nalanda Toddlers Vijayawada: Machavaram 
 Nalanda Toddlers Vijayawada: 1 Town
 Bloomingdale Vijayawada: Benz Circle

Inactive campuses
 Nalanda Junior College of Science & Arts, Vijayawada : IGMS Complex
 Nalanda Junior College of Science & Arts, Hyderabad Deepak mahal, Narayanaguda
 Nalanda Junior College of Science & Arts, Hyderabad  Dilsukh Nagar
 Nalanda Junior College of Science & Arts,  Hyderabad : 4th Floor, Chekkilam Alluri Trading Centre, Kukatpally
 Nalanda Junior College of Science & Arts, Secunderabad : Sai Ram Towers, Opp. YMCA, Alexandar Road
 Nalanda Junior College of Science & Arts, Visakhapatnam : Mittal Chambers, Asilmetta Junction
 Nalanda Junior College of Science & Arts, Guntur : II Floor, Annapurna Complex, Laxmipuram Main Road
 Nalanda Junior College of Science & Arts, Nellore : Beside Red Cross Building, Madras Bus Stand
 Nalanda Junior College of Science & Arts, Cuddapah : G. P. R. Junior College Premises, Dwaraka Nagar
 Nalanda Junior College of Science & Arts, Kakinada : Padmapriya complex, Bhanugudi Jn
 Nalanda Junior College of Science & Arts, Chittoor : Naidu Buildings, Near Raghava Theatre
 Nalanda Junior College of Science & Arts, Machilipatnam : Parasupet
 Nalanda Junior College of Science & Arts, Tenali 
 Nalanda Residential Junior College, Vijayawada (Rural) : Ganguru
 Nalanda Residential Junior College, Vijayawada : Pinnamaneni Poly Clinic Road
 Nalanda Residential Junior College, Vijayawada : IIT-JEE Coaching Centre, Madhu Nagar
 Nalanda Residential Junior College, Vijayawada : Suman Towers
 Nalanda Residential Junior College, Hyderabad : Near Kamineni Hospitals, L.B. Nagar
 Nalanda Residential Junior College, Guntur : Ring Road
 Nalanda Residential Junior College, Guntur : Siddartha Nagar
 Nalanda Residential Junior College, Visakhapatnam : R.K. Towers, Waltair Road
 Nalanda Residential Junior College, Nellore : Anakat Road
 Nalanda Residential Junior College, Chittoor : Naidu Buildings
 Nalanda Residential Junior College, Machilipatnam : Parasupet
 Nalanda Mahila Kalasala, Vijayawada : Sardar Patel Road
 Nalanda Mahila Kalasala, Nellore : Ditus Road (Bi Pass Road)
 Nalanda Mahila Kalasala, Chittoor : Naidu Buildings
 Nalanda Mahila Kalasala, Guntur : Vikas Nagar
 Nalanda Mahila Kalasala, Visakhapatnam
 Nalanda Mahila Kalasala, Machilipatnam : Parasupet

References

External links
Nalanda Educational Institutions Website .
The Hindu . 
Documentary with history .

1988 establishments in Andhra Pradesh
Education in Vijayawada
Educational organisations based in India
Educational institutions established in 1988